Sprint Bandits is an open-wheel auto racing sanctioning body that organizes the O'Reilly Sprint Bandits Tour 'N Topless (TNT) Midwest Swing event for wingless 410-ci sprint cars.  Sprint Bandits is part of a larger organization, the American Sprint Car Series, (ASCS).

2008 Tour 'N Topless Midwest Swing Schedules

Past O'Reilly Sprint Bandits TNT Midwest Swing Champions:
2004 - Shane Stewart*
2005 - Levi Jones
2006 - Jesse Hockett
2007 - Robert Ballou and Tim Kaeding, Co-Champions
2008 - Dave Darland
2009 - Brady Bacon
2010 - Robert Ballou

Winged 410 Sprint Cars in 2004

References

External links
Official website
Race Results
Race Videos

Auto racing organizations in the United States